Imielno  is a village in Jędrzejów County, Świętokrzyskie Voivodeship, in south-central Poland. It is the seat of the gmina (administrative district) called Gmina Imielno.

The village has a population of 300.

Until 1954 , the seat of the Mierzwin commune. In the years 1975–1998 , the town administratively belonged to the Kielce Voivodeship.

The village is the seat of the Imielno commune. There is a football club in the village, GKS Imielno, founded in 2016.

History 
According to Jan Długosz , the village was owned by the Różyc family in the 15th century.

In the 19th century, a distillery operated here, which in 1876 produced 13,842 buckets. In 1827, Imielno had 22 houses and 96 inhabitants.

Church 
Church of st. Nicholas from the first half of thirteenth century, brick, rebuilt in the fifteenth and seventeenth centuries, currently in the Romanesque style with Gothic and Baroque elements . The main baroque altar from the first half of the 18th century. Inside, there are epitaphs from the 16th-19th centuries. The church with the bell tower has been entered into the register of immovable monuments (registration no.: A.89/1-2 of February 11, 1967).

References

Villages in Jędrzejów County
Kielce Governorate
Kielce Voivodeship (1919–1939)